Flutes & Reeds is an album by American jazz saxophonist/composer/arranger Ernie Wilkins and saxophonist/flautist Frank Wess featuring performances recorded in 1955 and first released on the Savoy label. The Shown cover art is from the 1970s Savoy Jazz
re-issue.

Reception
The Allmusic site awarded the album 4½ stars.

Track listing
All compositions by Ernie Wilkins except where noted
 "Shorty George" (Count Basie, Andy Gibson) - 5:40  	
 "Bouncin' with Boots"- 11:17  	
 "That's a Woman" (Marcel Daniels) - 3:19 	
 "Doin' the Thing" (Frank Foster) - 6:41	
 "Blues in a Cold Water Flat" - 5:14 	
 "Stereophonic" - 3:09

Personnel
Ernie Wilkins - alto saxophone, - featured on track 3 - arranger, conductor
Jerome Richardson, Frank Wess - tenor saxophone, flute 
Hank Jones - piano
Eddie Jones - bass
Kenny Clarke – drums

References 

Savoy Records albums
Ernie Wilkins albums
1955 albums
Albums produced by Ozzie Cadena
Frank Wess albums
Albums recorded at Van Gelder Studio